Sousan Azadi (born 1954) is the author, with Angela Ferrante, of the 1987 memoir Out of Iran, which was published by Time Warner's imprint Little, Brown and Company. The book describes her experiences in Iran during the Islamic Revolution of 1979, her brief imprisonment during this time, and her eventual escape from the country.

"Azadi" is a pen name which she assumed in order to protect her family members in Iran from harassment. She claims to be a great-granddaughter of a Qajar Shah.

Azadi currently lives in Canada, where she designs and sells jewelry.

Bibliography
 Flucht aus Iran, 1982
 Vlucht Uit Iran, 1987 (Co-authored with Ferrante Angela) 
  (Persian and English Edition)
 IRANMADHUN SUTAKA, 1991 
 
 
 Die letzte Jagd. / Flucht aus Iran. / Sturz ins Leere., 1993 (Co-authored with Nehberg, Rüdiger and Joe Simpson)
 IRANMADHUN SUTAKA, 2009

References

External links 
 Sousan Azadi's profile - WorldCat
 List of Azadi's published works

Living people
Iranian writers
Place of birth missing (living people)
1954 births
Iranian emigrants to Canada